is a binary pair of asteroids of approximately equal size and mass, each about  in diameter. Classified as a near-Earth asteroid and potentially hazardous object of the Apollo group,  was discovered by amateur astronomer Claudine Rinner at the Oukaïmeden Observatory on 21 December 2017. During the close encounter,  was resolved in high detail by concurrent radar observations by the Arecibo and Green Bank observatories, along with individual observations by the Goldstone Solar System Radar.  is likely an extinct or dormant comet due to its distant elliptical orbit and dark red surface.

Discovery 
 was discovered on 21 December 2017, by French amateur astronomer Claudine Rinner at the Oukaïmeden Observatory in Marrakesh, Morocco. The discovery formed part of the Morocco Oukaïmeden Sky Survey (MOSS) directed by Zouhair Benkhaldoun at the Cadi Ayyad University. The MOSS survey was designed for searching and characterizing the orbits of small Solar System bodies such as near-Earth asteroids and comets. As the sixth near-Earth asteroid discovered by the MOSS survey,  was found in images taken by the Oukaïmeden Observatory's 0.5-meter reflecting telescope, which was remotely operated by Rinner.

Follow-up observations of  spanned six days starting from its discovery, and the object was formally announced in a Minor Planet Electronic Circular issued by the Minor Planet Center on 27 December 2017.

These observations were from the Mount Lemmon Survey, which had observed  on 14 December 2017, seven days prior to its discovery by the Oukaïmeden Observatory.

Nomenclature 
Upon discovery, the asteroid was given the temporary internal designation tltv005. After follow up observations confirming the object, it was then given the provisional designation  by the Minor Planet Center on 27 December 2017. The provisional designation signifies the object's discovery date and year, with the second letter and numbers indicating that it is the 130th object discovered during the second half of December 2017.  has not yet been issued a permanent minor planet number by the Minor Planet Center due to its short observation arc of 270 days, which is insufficient for an orbit to be accurately determined.  is expected to receive a minor planet number once it has been observed for over at least four oppositions, which would take several years. Once it receives a minor planet number, it will be eligible for naming.

Orbit and classification 
Over the course of its orbit,  approaches 0.82 AU from the Sun at perihelion and recedes 4.82 AU from the Sun at aphelion, beyond the outer extent of the asteroid belt.

At aphelion,  approaches close to Jupiter's orbit, with a minimum orbital intersection distance (MOID) of 0.42 AU. At such close proximity to Jupiter's orbit,  has likely been gravitationally perturbed by Jupiter, indicated by its Tisserand parameter of 2.877, which is considered to be characteristic of comets. Because of its comet-like Tisserand parameter and relatively large orbit for a near-Earth object,  has been suspected to be an extinct or dormant Jupiter-family comet. Additional evidence for its cometary origin was found by optical and infrared spectroscopy in 2018, which revealed a reddish and low-albedo surface, consistent with the D-type spectral classification.

As a near-Earth object, the orbit of  crosses that of Earth's, which leads to occasional close approaches to the planet. It has a semi-major axis (orbital distance) greater than 1 AU and a perihelion distance within that of Earth's, therefore it is formally classified under the Apollo group of near-Earth asteroids. Given a small Earth MOID,  is considered a potentially hazardous asteroid (PHA) by the Minor Planet Center, under the definition that PHAs have Earth MOIDs less than 0.05 AU and absolute magnitudes brighter than 22.

2018 Earth approach 
At closest approach, 's apparent motion in the sky was 0.51 degrees per hour and was in the constellation of Andromeda, with an apparent magnitude of 16.6 and an angular separation of 66 degrees from the Sun.

Observations 

The June 2018 encounter with  provided an opportunity for radar observatories to study the asteroid's characteristics in detail. Led by radar astronomer Marina Brozović, GSSR observations of  spanned four days, lasting until 24 June 2018. During these observations, the GSSR's preliminary findings were alerted to astronomers at the Arecibo Observatory in Puerto Rico for further study.

Arecibo radar observations of  began on 23 June 2018. The  binary system was observed using a bistatic radar system where the Arecibo Observatory transmitted a radar signal to the pair of asteroids while the Green Bank Observatory in West Virginia received the signal reflected from the asteroids. Led by Arecibo radar astronomers Anne Virkki, Flaviane Venditti, Sean Marshal, along with Patrick Taylor at the Green Bank Observatory, bistatic radar observations resolved  at a resolution of 7.5 meters per pixel. Radar observations of  ended on 26 June 2018 after it had moved out of Arecibo's view. Concurrently, optical observations were also carried out by various observatories in order to compile a light curve of the binary system. Optical observations of  continued after the June 2018 encounter and detected possible mutual events or eclipses occurring between the components of the binary system.

Future approaches 
Over the course of its orbit in the next 200 years,  will continue to pass by Earth, though it will not make any approaches as close as the June 2018 encounter. In the next 100 years,  will make three Earth encounters within 0.2 AU (approximately 80 lunar distances), which will occur in February 2051, July 2088, and May 2107. The expected nominal approach distances for these dates are 0.123 AU, 0.179 AU, and 0.145 AU, respectively.

Binary system 

From the first Goldstone radar images, the two components appeared to be contact binary lobes as the components were viewed in front of each other. Additional radar observations by the Arecibo and Green Bank observatories resolved the  system in high resolution, confirming that the two components were indeed separate objects. Under satellite naming conventions by the International Astronomical Union, the satellite would be provisionally designated .

Physical characteristics 

Given their measured diameters and absolute magnitudes, the optical albedos of their surfaces are calculated to be as dark as charcoal, reflecting less than 3% of incident light. Unlike other binary asteroid systems observed by radar, the components of  appear to display a distinct difference in their shape, surface brightness and radar reflectivity. These differences imply that the two components may also have different densities, compositions, and surface roughnesses.

Orbit and rotation 

The pair of asteroids orbit each other around a common center of mass (barycenter) between them. It is uncertain whether both components rotate synchronously with their mutual orbital period, as there is evidence of non-principal-axis rotation (or rotational precession) and axial misalignment of both components. Light curve measurements of  taken between June and August 2018 show a secondary period of 14.88 hours and radar images suggest that the obliquities of the components are misaligned by a few degrees.

Notes

References

External links 

 Observatories Team Up to Reveal Rare Double Asteroid (press release), NASA Jet Propulsion Laboratory, 11 Jul 2018
 Goldstone Radar Observations Planning: Asteroids 2017 YE5, 1996 AW1, 2010 NY65, and 2018 LK, JPL Asteroid Radar Research, Jun 2018
 Planetary Society asteroid hunters help find rare type of double asteroid, Jason Davis, The Planetary Society, 24 Jul 2018
 2017 YE5, Asteroids with Satellites Database, Johnston's Archive, 27 May 2019
 
 
 

Minor planet object articles (unnumbered)

Near-Earth objects in 2018